Polymer classes include:

 Biopolymer
 Inorganic polymer
 Organic polymer
 Conductive polymer
 Copolymer
 Fluoropolymer
 Gutta-percha (Polyterpene)
 Phenolic resin
 Polyanhydrides
 Polyketone
 Polyester
 Polyolefin (Polyalkene)
 Rubber
 Silicone
 Silicone rubber
 Superabsorbent polymer
 Synthetic rubber
 Vinyl polymer